Nezavisen Vesnik is a daily newspaper in North Macedonia. Newspaper was free at the beginning but from 7 May 2018 price will be 10 MKD.

References

Newspapers published in North Macedonia
Macedonian-language newspapers